Arvand may refer to:

 Arvand Free Zone, a zone that surrounds Khorramshahr, Abadan, and Minoo Island along the Arvand waterway in Iran
 Shatt al-Arab, also known as Arvand Rud, a river in Southwest Asia formed by the confluence of the Euphrates and the Tigris
 Another name for the Alvand mountain range in Iran